Lisa Winning is an entrepreneur and digital technologist. She was the Founder and CEO of New York and Silicon Valley based startup, HeTexted. The website and app for crowdsourced advice led to book deals  with Penguin Random House, and Simon & Schuster, 
 consisting of the site's most popular user generated content.

Alongside Margaret Zhang, Roxy Jacenko, Tammy Barton, and Marita Cheng, Winning was recognized by Startup Daily as number 15 of the top 50 female entrepreneurs aged under 40 in Australian technology.

HeTexted was described as "an incredibly addicting formula", and Winning's unique idea to crowdsource advice for Millennials was covered by ABC News’ Good Morning America, CNN, The Wall Street Journal’s All Things Digital, The Guardian, and Today.

Winning raised venture capital from Silicon Valley investors including Dave McClure of 500 Startups, and is represented by US talent agency William Morris Endeavor, allowing the tech startup to expand into other media categories including books and film.

She has been interviewed by Good Morning America, the Huffington Post, CNBC, the Evening Standard  and recognized by Marie Claire for International Women's Day.

Winning has contributor columns with Forbes writing about technology and startups. She previously contributed to Virgin.

References

Living people
Alumni of the London School of Economics
Technology company founders
Chief executives in the technology industry
Australian women chief executives
Year of birth missing (living people)
Australian women company founders
Australian company founders